The 1925 Toronto Argonauts season was the 39th season for the team since the franchise's inception in 1873. The team finished in fourth place in the Interprovincial Rugby Football Union with a 2–4 record and failed to qualify for the playoffs.

Regular season

Standings

Schedule

References

Toronto Argonauts seasons